Michael Lawrence Tyler (born September 22, 1970), better known by his stage name Mystikal, is an American rapper. He initially gained fame in the mid-1990s as an artist under Master P and his No Limit Records collective.

Early life and education
Tyler grew up in New Orleans, Louisiana's 12th Ward. His father, who ran a small neighborhood store, died when Tyler was seven. He attended Cohen High School and afterward joined the United States Army as a combat engineer. As an aspiring rapper, he opened for Run-DMC and Doug E. Fresh at an outdoor concert at the Treme Center. Leroy "Precise" Edwards, the house producer for Big Boy Records, was in the audience, and granted him a contract.

Career

1994–1996: Early career and stint with Big Boy Records
Mystikal's debut album, Mystikal, was released on New Orleans-based independent record label Big Boy in 1994. The album was one of Big Boy's most successful albums and gained major success for Mystikal. In 1995, he found himself involved in conflict with fellow New Orleans rappers signed to rival Cash Money, including U.N.L.V. and The B.G.'z. They dissed him on tracks like "Drag 'Em in Tha River" by U.N.L.V. and "Fuck Big Boy" by The B.G.'z. He struck back with "Beware" and "Here I Go" which were on his second album, Mind of Mystikal. Mystikal's sister, Michelle Tyler, sang the chorus on "Not That Nigga" and her fate became a major influence on Mystikal's music after her death in September 1994. The songs "Dedicated to Michelle Tyler", "Murder" (both on Mind of Mystikal), "Murder 2", "Shine" (both on Unpredictable) and "Murder III" (on Let's Get Ready) refer to her death. Mystikal and Lil Wayne would eventually squash their feud and become collaborators.

1995–2000: Mind of Mystikal and stint with Big Boy Records
Mystikal signed to Jive and released Mind of Mystikal in 1995. He signed to Master P's No Limit in 1996 and released Unpredictable in November 1997. He appeared on many of the No Limit albums released from 1997 through a chunk of 2000. He also collaborated with Mariah Carey on her Rainbow album on the track 'Did I Do That'. In late 1998, he released Ghetto Fabulous. That was his last album with the label, and he and No Limit parted ways in 2000.

2000–2004: Let's Get Ready, Tarantula and prison
In 1999, he had begun recording his fourth album before leaving No Limit. Let's Get Ready was released in 2000 and contained "Danger (Been So Long)", which featured rising pop star Nivea, and was the Billboard Hot R&B/Hip-Hop Songs number-one single in June 2001. Let's Get Ready debuted at number one on the Billboard 200, making it Mystikal's only chart-topping album to date. The album also featured the popular, Neptunes-produced hit "Shake Ya Ass". The song attained cult-like popularity and can be heard in the background of numerous movies.

Mystikal's most recent solo release was the 2001 album Tarantula, which contained the hit single, "Bouncin' Back (Bumpin' Me Against The Wall)". Though it presented Mystikal's typical and funky flow style, which had the distinction of drawing comparison to legendary R&B soul screamers Little Richard and James Brown, the song also saw a blending of jazz and swing elements with hip-hop. The well received album was nominated for a Grammy Award for Best Rap Album in 2003, and Mystikal was nominated for a Grammy Award for Best Male Rap Solo Performance that same year. Mystikal was also featured prominently in the single, "Move Bitch" by Ludacris as well as "I Don't Give a Fuck" by Lil Jon & The East Side Boyz along with Krayzie Bone, both in 2002. In 2003 he starred in the film 13 Dead Men. In 2003, Mystikal was indicted on charges of sexual battery and extortion. On January 15, 2004, he was sentenced to six years in prison after pleading guilty to forcing his hairstylist to perform sex acts. He served the full six years of his sentence and was released on January 14, 2010.

2010–present

Mystikal headlined a concert at the Mahalia Jackson Theater of the Performing Arts on Mardi Gras, February 16, 2010. Mystikal's first song after being released from prison was an underground track with former No Limit labelmate Fiend entitled "I Don't Like You". A few weeks later, Atlanta-based, New Orleans-born R&B artist Lloyd released "Set Me Free" featuring Mystikal. The music video for "Set Me Free" was released on May 18, 2010, and was shot in New Orleans, primarily from the Calliope Projects.
 
In an interview in May 2010, he stated that he was still obligated to Jive Records for one more album and would be taking the necessary time to ensure the album would be his best to date. He made a promo song called "Papercuts" featuring Fiend and Lil Wayne. In 2011, he performed at the Gathering of the Juggalos. Mystikal and Busta Rhymes were signed to Cash Money Records by Birdman on November 16 the same year. His first single for the label, "Original", was released shortly thereafter and featured new label-mates Birdman and Lil Wayne.

In 2014, Mystikal recorded "Feel Right" for Mark Ronson's Uptown Special. The song and video were released in 2015.

Also in 2015, Mystikal appeared on Stevie Stone's Single Rain Dance with Tech N9ne from the 2015 release Malta Bend.

In January 2016, he performed in shows in Bahrain and Bulgaria with Danny! In February 2016, Mystikal toured the United States.

In April 2016, Mystikal was featured on Just a Lil' Thick (She Juicy) by Trinidad James along with Lil Dicky.

Personal life
On his 24th birthday, Mystikal found his sister Michelle Tyler dead in her bedroom, having been stabbed and strangled. Her boyfriend at the time, Damion Neville, was charged with murder but later was acquitted due to a lack of evidence and a recanted confession.

Sexual battery conviction and other legal issues
On June 26, 2003, Mystikal pleaded guilty to sexual battery and extortion. On January 15, 2004, Mystikal was sentenced to six years in state prison after pleading guilty to sexually assaulting his hairstylist. The rapper and two bodyguards forced the woman to perform oral sex, and accused her of stealing $80,000 in checks. As part of a plea bargain, all three pleaded guilty. Mystikal initially claimed that the incident was consensual, but a videotape of the incident was later found at his home shortly after the charges were made. Negotiations during the trial held the videotape from being entered as evidence and Mystikal agreed to the plea bargain offered by the prosecution, avoiding the mandatory life sentence for sexual battery in Louisiana and expecting to receive probation. However, the case took a twist when the judge viewed the videotape at the sentencing, took into account Mystikal's two prior arrests (for drug and gun possession), and had him remanded into custody to begin serving a six-year sentence immediately. Mystikal's bodyguards, Leland Ellis and Vercy Carter, also pleaded guilty to sexual battery.

In August 2005, while incarcerated on the state sexual battery and extortion charges, Mystikal was charged federally with two misdemeanor counts of failing to file tax returns for 1998 and 1999. On January 12, 2006, he was convicted in federal court of the tax offenses, but was allowed to serve the one-year federal sentence concurrent with his six-year state sentence. Mystikal was incarcerated at Louisiana's Elayn Hunt Correctional Center. On January 19, 2006, Mystikal was denied parole at a parole board hearing. On January 11, 2007, Mystikal was released from custody on the federal misdemeanor tax convictions (as his one-year sentence had expired), but he remained in custody on the six-year sentence for the Louisiana state felony convictions. The news of his release caused confusion among fans who heard the news and mistakenly thought he had been released on parole. He was released January 14, 2010. After his release, Mystikal was registered as a sex offender.

On February 22, 2012, Mystikal was arrested again following a dispute with his domestic partner and was later given a misdemeanor charge of domestic abuse battery. He was detained for nine days and then released on bail. On April 16, he was given a three-month jail sentence for violating the terms of his probation he was given following his release from prison in January 2010. He was given credit for the nine days already served, reducing his confinement to 81 days. He began serving his sentence on May 14 at the East Baton Rouge Parish Jail. During his incarceration, he appeared in court to be heard on the domestic battery charges as well as for a hearing to determine child support payments for his two youngest children. Mystikal was released from jail in August 2012.

On August 21, 2017, Mystikal turned himself into the Caddo Parish Sheriff's Department after a warrant was issued for his arrest. He was subsequently charged with rape. He was held at the Caddo Correctional Center on a $3 million bond until February 14, 2019, when he was able to post bond. On December 17, 2020, the rape charges were dismissed due to lack of evidence.

On July 31, 2022, Mystikal was arrested in Ascension Parish, Louisiana.  According to WDSU Louisiana, Mystikal faces the following five charges:  simple criminal damage to property; false imprisonment; domestic abuse, battery, and strangulation; simple robbery; and first-degree rape.

Discography

Studio albums
Mystikal (1994)
Mind of Mystikal (1995)
Unpredictable (1997)
Ghetto Fabulous (1998)
Let's Get Ready (2000)
Tarantula (2001)

References

External links

1970 births
Living people
African-American male rappers
American extortionists
American people convicted of tax crimes
Jive Records artists
No Limit Records artists
Rappers from New Orleans
Southern hip hop musicians
Gangsta rappers
Hardcore hip hop artists
21st-century American rappers
21st-century American male musicians
United States Army personnel of the Gulf War
20th-century African-American people
21st-century African-American musicians